Tony Tremblay is a Canadian poet, writer, spoken word artist, journalist and radio personality, born in Jonquière, Quebec in 1968, and now living in Montreal.

Biography
Tremblay is the co-founder of Exit poetry magazine. He was awarded the prestigious Émile-Nelligan prize in 1998, and the Salon du livre du Saguenay-Lac-Saint-Jean award for his poetry book Rue Pétrole-Océan.

Producer, radio host, TV reporter, publisher, blogger and webmaster, Tony Tremblay also occasionally performs his poetry live on stage, alone or with musicians. Tony Tremblay performed his poetry all across the province of Quebec, in Canada, and in France.

Among other shows, Tony Tremblay is famous for his performances as a host of the Night Shift series during the Festival Voix d'Amériques, a poetry and spoken word event held in Montreal during winter.

Tony Tremblay's bibliography
Rock Land, Montréal, l'Hexagone, 2006  -  
Rue Pétrole-Océan (new edition - first published in 1998), Montréal, l'Hexagone, 2004  -  
Des receleurs, Montréal, l'Hexagone, 2001  -  
Contagion, Trois-Rivières, Écrits des Forges, 1996  -

External links 
 dieu diesel Tony Tremblay's blog (in French)
éditions de l'Hexagone Tony Tremblay's publisher (in French)
Écrits des Forges Écrits des Forges: poetry publisher from Trois-Rivières
Tony Tremblay on ARTV video on dieudiesel.com: Tony Tremblay on Mange ta ville TV show (in French)

1968 births
Canadian spoken word poets
20th-century Canadian poets
Canadian male poets
21st-century Canadian poets
Canadian radio personalities
Canadian poets in French
French Quebecers
Living people
Writers from Saguenay, Quebec
20th-century Canadian male writers
21st-century Canadian male writers